Yanıq Ələz (also, Yanıq Alayaz, Yanıqələz, Ashaga Alyaz, and Yanykhalayaz) is a village in the Siazan Rayon of Azerbaijan.  The village forms part of the municipality of Yuxarı Ələz.

References 

Populated places in Siyazan District